Magali Noëlle Guiffray (27 June 1931 – 23 June 2015), better known as Magali Noël, was a French actress and singer.

Biography

Actress career 
Born in İzmir to French parents in the diplomatic service, she left Turkey for France in 1951, and her acting career began soon thereafter. 

She acted in multilingual cinema chiefly from 1951 to 1980, appearing in three Italian films directed by Federico Fellini, for whom she was a favorite performer and known as his muse.   She took on a new dimension by embodying one of the symbols of Federico Fellini's sexual fantasies in La dolce vita (1960), Satyricon (1969), and Amarcord (1973), where she played Gradisca, provincial pin-up.

She acted in films directed by Costa Gavras, Jean Renoir and Jules Dassin. Despite a notable role in Z by Costa-Gavras, Palme d'Or at Cannes in 1969, and great successes at the theater, it subsequently received less attention from producers. She then returned successfully to the music hall.

A new generation of directors then gave her roles: Chantal Akerman (Les Rendez-vous d'Anna, 1978), Claude Goretta (La Mort de Mario Ricci, 1983), Tonie Marshall (Pentimento, 1989), Andrzej Żuławski (La Fidélité, 2000), Jonathan Demme (The Truth About Charlie, 2002).

Her career extended to television movies from roughly 1980 to 2002.

Singer career 
Her recording career began in France in 1956, and her most famous song was "Fais-moi mal, Johnny" ("Hurt me Johnny"), written by Boris Vian. This song was one of the first rock 'n' roll songs with French lyrics. It was censored from the radio due to its risqué lyrics. 

She died on 23 June 2015, four days before her 84th birthday.

Filmography

1951: Demain nous divorçons – Jeanne Tourelle
1951: Alone in Paris – Jeanette Milliard
1953: Deux de l'escadrille
1954: Mourez nous ferons le reste – Françoise
1955: Caroline and the Rebels – Térésa
1955: Razzia sur la chnouf – Lisette
1955: Rififi – Viviane 
1955: Chantage – Denise
1955: Les Grandes Manœuvres – Thérèse
1956: Les Possédées – Pia Manosque
1956: Eléna et les hommes – Lolotte, Elena's maid
1957: Assassins et voleurs – Madeleine Ferrand
1957: OSS 117 Is Not Dead – Muriel Rousset
1958: Le désir mène les hommes – Nathalie
1958: Si le roi savait ça – Arnaude
1958: Le Piège – Cora Caillé
1958: La Loi de l'homme (È arrivata la parigina) – Yvette
1959: Ça n'arrive qu'aux vivants – Gloria Selby
1959: Temptation – Jane
1959: Des femmes disparaissent – Coraline Merlin
1959: Oh! Qué mambo – Viviane Montero
1959: Noi siamo due evasi – Odette
1960: Marie of the Isles – Julie
1960: Gastone – Sonia
1960: La Dolce Vita – Fanny
1960: Boulevard – Jenny Dorr
1960: A Qualcuna Piace Calvo – Marcella Salustri
1961:  – Lénq
1961: Girl in the Window – Chanel
1961:  – Olga
1961: Jeunesse de nuit (Gioventù di notte) – Elvi
1961: Dans la gueule du loup – Barbara Yabakos
1961: Destination Fury  
1961:  (Le Jeu de l'assassin) – Eva Troger
1962: The Secret Mark of D'Artagnan (Il Colpo segreto di d'Artagnan) – Carlotta
1963: Storm Over Ceylon – Gaby
1963: The Accident – Andréa
1963: Toto and Cleopatra – Cleopatra
1964: Queste pazze pazze donne – Giulia - Martini's wife ('La garçonnière')
1964: I marziani hanno 12 mani – Matilde Bernabei
1964: Requiem pour un caïd – Éva
1964: Oltraggio al pudore – Giovenella's sister
1964: Le Dernier Tiercé – Lydia
1965: Hot Frustrations – Louisa
1965: La Corde au cou
1965: Aventure à Beyrouth (La Dama de Beirut) – Gloria Lefevre
1966: Comment ne pas épouser un milliardaire (TV Series) – Delia Delamarre
1967: Le Golem (TV Movie) – Angelina
1968: The Most Beautiful Month – Claudia
1968: L'Astragale – Annie
1969: Z – Nick's sister
1969: Satyricon – Fortunata
1970: Tropic of Cancer – the princess
1970: The Lustful Vicar (Kyrkoherden) – the countess
1970: The Man Who Had Power Over Women – Mme Franchetti
1970: The Swinging Confessors – Signora Bellini
1970: Edipeon
1971: Le Belve – Lisa (segment "Il cincillà")
1972: Comme avant mieux qu'avant (TV Movie) – Fulvia Gelli
1972: Le p'tit vient vite – La garde-malade
1972: Racconti proibiti... di niente vestiti – Prudenzia
1973: Amarcord – Ninola / "Gradisca", the hairdresser
1975: Paolo Barca, Schoolteacher and Weekend Nudist – Signora cacchiò
1975: Il tempo degli assassini – Rossana
1975: La Banca di Monate – Melissa, Adelmo's wife
1977: Stato interessante – Tilde La Monica (second story)
1978: Jean-Christophe (TV Series)
1979: Les Rendez-vous d'Anna – Ida
1980: Le Chemin perdu – Maria
1980: Le président est gravement malade (TV Movie) – Edith Wilson
1982: The Confessions of Felix Krull (TV Mini-Series) – Mme Houpflé
1982: Qu'est-ce qui fait courir David ? – Sarah, David's mother
1982: L'Enfant et les magiciens (TV Series) – Aunt Marguerite
1983: Les Années 80
1983: The Death of Mario Ricci – Solange
1984: Sortie interdite (TV Series) – Mado
1985: Diesel – Mickey
1985: Vertiges – Constance
1986: Exit-exil – Solange
1986: L'Amour tango (TV Series) – Angèle
1988: On the Orient, North (The Ray Bradbury Theater, ep.#2.8) – Minerva Halliday
1989: Pentimento – Maddeleine
1989: La Nuit de l'éclusier – Hélène Belloz
1991: Crimes et jardins (TV Movie) – Suzanne
1992: Les Coeurs brûlés (miniseries) – Julia
1997: Les Héritiers (TV Movie) – Zizi
1998: Le Dernier Fils (TV Movie) – Elisabeth Haas
1999: La Nuit des hulottes (TV Series) – Rainette Leblanc
2000: Fidelity – Clélia's mother
2001: Regina Coeli – Regina
2002: La Source des Sarrazins (TV Movie) – Rose
2002: The Truth About Charlie'' – mysterious woman in black (final film role)

Discography
 1956 : Fais-moi mal Johnny de Boris Vian
 1964 : Magali Noël chante Boris Vian
 1988 : Magali Noël chante Boris Vian (CD Jacques Canetti/Musidisc)
 1989 : Regard sur Vian, with Stéphanie Noël, live in Beausobre
 2002 : Magali Noël (CD Story Mercury)

References

External links
 
 

French film actresses
French television actresses
1931 births
2015 deaths
Actresses from İzmir
20th-century French actresses
21st-century French actresses
20th-century French women singers
Musicians from İzmir